Wolfram Meier-Augenstein is a professor at Robert Gordon University, Aberdeen, UK, a registered forensic expert advisor with the British National Crime Agency and a member of the Advisory Board of the journal Rapid Communications in Mass Spectrometry.

Biography
Meier-Augenstein was born in September 1959. He completed his studies in Chemistry and Molecular Genetics at the Ruprechts Karl University of Heidelberg, Germany in 1987. He is a certified radiation protection officer and served as such at the Institute of Organic Chemistry from 1986 to 1989. He holds a doctorate in natural sciences (Dr. rer. nat.) awarded by the Ruprechts Karl University of Heidelberg in 1989. The subject of his PhD thesis was the structure/activity relationship of stereoisomers of the Periodic Leaf Movement Factor 1 that triggers the nastic leaf movement of Mimosa pudica. As Feodor-Lynen-Fellow of the Alexander von Humboldt Foundation and PD Fellow of the South African Research Foundation he spent one and a half years as post-doctoral fellow with Prof. B.V. Burger at the Stellenbosch University. Here he synthesised and studied cyclodextrin derivatives used as chiral selectors for selective gas chromatography. From there, his career took him to the [University Children's Hospital Heidelberg, the University of California, San Diego, the University of Dundee, the Queen's University Belfast and back to Scotland, first to the James Hutton Institute, Dundee and finally Robert Gordon University, Aberdeen.

From 2010 to 2014 he served as Director of the Forensic Isotope Ratio Mass Spectrometry Network (FIRMS). while from 2009 to 2013 he was a Council member of the British Association for Human Identification (BAHID). He was one of the scientists consulted by the Garda Síochána investigating the case of the dismembered torso found in the Dublin Royal Canal. This case gained notoriety under the name Scissor Sisters. He was also one of the scientists consulted by the police investigating the Norfolk headless body case.

Most recently Meier-Augenstein was involved with the investigation of the death of Lamduan Armitage dubbed "The Lady of the Hills" and the "Thai Bride".  His interpretation of stable isotopic signatures obtained from remains of the murder victim corroborated one line of investigation that the victim might have grown up in Thailand. A subsequently launched public appeal received a response from a Thai family who believed the victim could be their daughter. DNA tests finally confirmed the identity of the victim as Lamduan Armitage, nee Seekanya, originally from Thailand who had moved to the UK in 1991.

He is the author of the 2010 book Stable Isotope Forensics, the first textbook dedicated to principles and forensic applications of stable isotope analytical techniques.

On 26 December 2022 Meier-Augenstein appeared in the 2022 Royal Institution Christmas Lectures, with the title 'Secrets of Forensic Science', delivered by Sue Black, Baroness Black of Strome.

Selected publications

Articles
 
 W. Meier-Augenstein and R. H. Liu: "Forensic Applications of Isotope Ratio Mass Spectrometry", in Advances in Forensic Application of Mass Spectrometry by Jehuda Yinon [ed.], CRC Press, Boca Raton, Florida (USA), (2003), chapter 4, 149 - 180, .
 
 W. Meier-Augenstein: "Stable Isotope Fingerprinting", in Forensic Human Identification: An Introduction by S. M. Black & T.J.U. Thomson [eds.], CRC Press, Boca Raton, Florida (USA), (2006), chapter 2, 29-53, .
 
 
 
 
 
 
 
 
 
 
 
 
 W. Meier-Augenstein: "Forensic Isotope Analysis" in McGraw-Hill Yearbook of Science & Technology 2014, pp 120–124, (2014); .

Books
Stable Isotope Forensics: An Introduction to the Forensic Application of Stable Isotope Analysis. Wiley, 2010. 
Stable Isotope Forensics: Methods and Forensic Applications of Stable Isotope Analysis, 2nd Edition. Wiley, 2018.

References

External links
Academia.edu
Researchgate.net
App.dundee.ac.uk

Living people
Academics of Robert Gordon University
Forensic scientists
1959 births